The Oberoi, Gurgaon is a luxury hotel in Gurgaon, the business hub on the outskirts of capital New Delhi. The hotel is situated right next to the Trident Hotel property close to NH-8, also under a management contract with Orbit Resorts.

In January 2012, it became the first Indian luxury hotel to be named, "the World's Leading Luxury Hotel for 2011", at the annual 'World Travel Awards'. Previously in December 2011, CNNGo named it amongst, "11 Indian hotels to visit in 2012".

The hotel restaurants include the 24-hour multi-cuisine Threesixtyone and Amaranta which serves speciality coastal Indian cuisine. The property also has a bar termed as 'The Piano Bar', a cigar lounge and a spa.

Design and construction
The Oberoi Gurgaon was designed by Singapore-based architects RSP Architects Planner and Engineers Pte. Ltd. and was built in the period of four years by New Delhi-based civil contractors, B.L. Kashyap & Sons in association with glazing contractors URE-Quattro. Other designers for the hotel included PLA of Bangkok (Landscape), Lim Teo Wilkes of Kuala Lumpur (Interiors) and Aurecon Facades of Singapore (Glazing Design). The design for the hotel was shortlisted for the Best Hotel Design in the built projects category at the 2012 edition of the World Architecture Festival held in Singapore.

References

External links
 The Oberoi, Gurgaon, Official website
 

Buildings and structures in Gurgaon
Economy of Gurgaon
Hotel buildings completed in 2011
Hotels established in 2011
Hotels in India
The Oberoi Group